The Mixed Pairs BC4 boccia competition at the 2004 Summer Paralympics was held from 26 to 28 September at the Ano Liosia Olympic Hall.

This class consisted of a single round-robin pool only, with no knock-out phase. The event was won by Lau Yan Chi and Leung Yuk Wing, representing .

Results

Final Round

Pool W

References

X